Sargoshiyan (English: Whispers) is a 2017 Indian drama film directed and produced by Imran Khan under his banner Imran Khans Production. The film is completely shot in Kashmir and explores the never seen before breath taking places. The film was released on 26 May 2017 by Dimension Pictures. It received Mixed Reviews from Critics.

Synopsis 
The story of the film is weaved around Kashmir and Kashmiri people's simplicity, pride and Kashmiriyat. It's a very simple and interesting theme, all about Kashmir where Jammu and Kashmir and the Kashmiri people are central to certain developments taking place in the movie. In the recent past, Kashmir has been portrayed in many films for the unrest in the region, however in this film there is no violence and the movie depicts the beauty and chastity of Kashmir and Kashmiris.
The movie portrays how even today Muslims and Pandit's stay in harmony in the Kashmir Valley. The film travels through many beautiful locations in Kashmir. It's a soul-searching journey for the characters where they meet different people undergoing their challenges in very difficult conditions and yet they are positive, hopeful and facing the harsh realities of life with a 'never say die' attitude.

Cast 
 Alok Nath as Pandit Raina
 Farida Jalal as Rahima
 Imran Khan as Imran Dar
 Indraneil Sengupta as Vikram Roy
 Shahbaz Khan as Hamza Gujjar
 Aditi Bhatia as Payal
 Sara Khan as Sheena Oberoi
 Tom Alter as Alan Alter
 Hasan Zaidi as Aryan Raina
 Aparna Kumar as Ragini
 Khalid Siddiqui as Bank Manager 
 Zameer Ashai as Historian Sarfaraz Sahab
 GM Wani as Ghulam Chacha
 Zahoor Zaidi as Nabeer, a houseboat owner

References 

 
 http://www.thestatesman.com/television/tv-actor-imran-khan-wraps-up-sargoshiyan-1482318951.html
 
 http://www.fridaymoviez.com/news/imran-finishes-shooting-of-his-upcoming-film-sargoshiyan
 http://oyefilmy.in/filmy/imran-khan-finishes-shooting-last-schedule-of-his-upcoming-film-sargoshiyan/
 http://newsdog.today/a/article/585b69ff1290717292e78b1b/
 http://urbanasian.com/bollywood/2017/01/j-and-k-director-tourism-of-the-state-mr-mahmood-ahmad-shah-praises-imran-khan-for-his-film-sargoshiyan/
 http://mumbainewsnetwork.blogspot.in/2017/01/j-k-director-tourism-of-state-mr.html
 http://www.ucnews.in/news/101-3506352886761332/imran-finishes-shooting-of-his-upcoming-film-sargoshiyan.html

External links
 Sargoshiyan on IMDB
 Sargoshiyan on Bollywood Hungama

2017 films
2010s Hindi-language films
Indian drama films
Films set in Jammu and Kashmir
2017 drama films
Hindi-language drama films